Loyola Field House was an indoor arena in New Orleans, Louisiana.  It hosted the ABA's New Orleans Buccaneers for two seasons (1967–68 and 1968–69), and the NBA's New Orleans Jazz (1974–1975). It was also the home venue for Loyola Wolf Pack basketball. The arena held 6,500 people.

History
The Field House was built on the campus of Loyola University in New Orleans in 1954 as a home for the university's basketball team. 

When the ABA awarded New Orleans a franchise in 1967, the Bucs made an agreement to play their home games at the Field House. They advanced to the ABA Finals in 1967–68, losing to the Pittsburgh Pipers in seven games. The team was led by Doug Moe and Larry Brown, ABA stars and future successful coaches. For the 1969–1970 season, their third, the team moved to Tulane Gymnasium and the Municipal Auditorium. After the season, the team relocated to Memphis as the Memphis Pros.

The New Orleans Jazz played some of their home games at the Field House for their inaugural 1974–75 season.

When Loyola dropped varsity sports after the 1971–72 school year, the building became the Recreation Center, with most of the seating torn out. The building was demolished in 1986 to make way for a new Recreational Sports Complex and parking garage.

References

New Orleans Jazz venues
New Orleans Buccaneers venues
Loyola Wolf Pack men's basketball
Former National Basketball Association venues
American Basketball Association venues
Defunct college basketball venues in the United States
Defunct indoor arenas in the United States
Defunct sports venues in New Orleans
Demolished sports venues in Louisiana
Basketball venues in New Orleans
Indoor arenas in New Orleans
1954 establishments in Louisiana
1986 disestablishments in Louisiana
Sports venues demolished in 1986
Sports venues completed in 1954